Harriet Arline Forte Kennedy (November 22, 1931 – February 12, 1994) was an American museum administrator, sculptor, and singer.

Early life and education 
Born in Cambridge, Massachusetts, Kennedy was educated in local schools before attending the Massachusetts College of Art, the Institute of Art Administration at Harvard University, and Northeastern University, where she received a bachelor's degree. She studied at the School of the Museum of Fine Arts, Boston from 1960 to 1965, and undertook graduate studies at Boston University in 1965.

Career 
She began her career with the Museum of Fine Arts, Boston before becoming assistant director of the Museum of Afro-American Artists. Kennedy was also a coloratura soprano who sang at venues throughout the Boston area.

Personal life 
Kennedy died in Medford, Massachusetts  1994. She has three children, including a foster daughter.

References

1931 births
1994 deaths
American women sculptors
20th-century American sculptors
20th-century African-American women singers
20th-century American women opera singers
African-American women opera singers
20th-century American women artists
American operatic sopranos
American art curators
American women curators
Artists from Cambridge, Massachusetts
Sculptors from Massachusetts
Musicians from Cambridge, Massachusetts
Singers from Massachusetts
Massachusetts College of Art and Design alumni
Harvard University alumni
Northeastern University alumni
School of the Museum of Fine Arts at Tufts alumni
Boston University alumni
African-American sculptors
African-American women artists
Classical musicians from Massachusetts